Kevork Malikyan (born 2 June 1943) is an English-Armenian actor and teacher. He is known for his roles as Kazim in the film Indiana Jones and the Last Crusade (1989), Max Papandrious in the television sitcom Mind Your Language (1977–1979) and Rady in the film Flight of the Phoenix (2004) and Parvus in paytaht Abdülhamid  (2017)

Career
Malikyan made his first television appearance in an episode of the British Historical drama The Portrait of a Lady in 1968 playing the role of ‘servant’. Through out the last years of the 1960s Malikyan made other numerous television appearances including Doctor Who, The Saint, and The Avengers. Malikyan got his big break in the British film The Man Who Haunted Himself in 1970, starring Roger Moore, in which Malikyan played Luigi the butler of the Pelham family. In 1977 Malikyan embarked on his most notable role on British television, in the ITV sitcom Mind Your Language, which was about an Adult education centre  and followed the story to the ‘English as a foreign language’ class. In the series Malikyan played Maximilian (Max) Papandrious, a Greek shipping worker from Athens. The show was very successful and at its height attracted 18 million viewers, Malikyan appeared in 29 episodes from 1977 to the series conclusion in 1979. Although the series was briefly revived in 1986 he did not make any appearances in it. Malikyans next big film role came in the 1978 with the prison film Midnight Express, in which he played the part of The Prosecutor. The film was directed by Alan Parker and starred Brad Davis, Irene Miracle and Bo Hopkins. The film was very popular and went on to win two Academy Awards. His performance did not go unnoticed, one director who especially noticed him was Steven Spielberg. Malikyan tried to audition for the part of Sallah in Raiders of the Lost Ark, but was prevented from doing so by heavy traffic. In 1988 Spielberg cast Malikyan in the third in the Indiana Jones Series, Indiana Jones and the Last Crusade in which he played Kazim, the leader of the Brotherhood of the Cruciform Sword, an organization that protects the Holy Grail. Throughout the 1990s Malikyan appeared in various television programs including the sitcom Birds of a Feather, and The Final Cut. In 2002 he featured alongside Steven Seagal in the American Action film, Belly of the Beast but the film was not well received by the critics. Two years later Malikyan appeared in the 2004 re-make of the 1965 film of the same name, Flight of the Phoenix in which he played Rady. The film received mixed reviews and performed poorly at the box-office. During his career, Malikyan has performed in a number of Shakespeare play including Henry IV, Part 1 and Henry IV, Part 2 at the Shakespeare Globe Theatre in 2010. Malikyan also played in a number of roles in the Royal Shakespeare Company production, Arabian Nights (December 2009 – January 2010), at the Courtyard Theatre, Stratford-upon-Avon, Warwickshire. Malikyan appeared as Inspector Durmaz in the 2012 action-thriller film Taken 2, which was a sequel of the highly successful 2008 film. Two years later Malikyan appeared in the epic biblical film Exodus: Gods and Kings in which he played Jethro. The film was based on the Book of Exodus and was directed by Ridley Scott. The same year he starred alongside Tahar Rahim and Simon Abkarian in the internationally co-produced drama film The Cut. In 2016 Malikyan featured in the historical drama The Promise which was set in the final years of the Ottoman Empire.

Background
Malikyan was born to Armenian parents in Diyarbakır, Turkey. When he was 10 years old, an archbishop decided to open a religious seminary in Üsküdar, Istanbul, with the intention of taking in the poor children of Armenian parents from various parts of Turkey and bringing them up as priests. Malikyan was questioned by a priest who wanted to determine whether or not he was a good candidate for the priesthood. His father told him to go to the seminary because he could not afford to give him an education due to financial problems. Though Malikyan was worried because he had no friends in Istanbul and had to leave his parents behind, he went to the city to become a priest.

Malikyan was sent to the Karagözyan Orphanage in Şişli where he spent two years before attending the religious seminary in Üsküdar. In the seminary, there was a small stage where the students acted in Turkish and Armenian. When he was 16, an Anglican priest was invited to the school to teach them English. He was an Oxford graduate who wrote history books. The man was also fond of acting and had prepared Richard III by Shakespeare in English, wherein Malikyan played Richard. The priest must have liked Malikyan's acting, because he told the headmaster of the school that Malikyan should become an actor rather than a priest. The patriarch asked Malikyan his opinion on the matter, but Malikyan was unsure because of financial concerns. Father Harding, a British priest, found him a scholarship in Britain.

Malikyan graduated from the Surp Haç Armenian High School in Istanbul, then moved to London in 1963 for acting education. At the drama school Rose Bruford College, he received diplomas for acting and teaching. He now lives in Istanbul, where he also works as a teacher.

Partial filmography
The Man Who Haunted Himself (1970) – Luigi
Midnight Express (1978) – Prosecutor
Sphinx (1981) – Bell Boy
Trenchcoat (1983) – Arab
Half Moon Street (1986) – First Diplomat
Pascali's Island (1988) – Mardosian
Indiana Jones and the Last Crusade (1989) – Kazim
Paparazzo (1995) – Mackenzie
The Commissioner (1998) – Greek commissioner
Belly of the Beast (2002) – Demetrio Altafini
Flight of the Phoenix (2004) – Rady
Renaissance (2006) – Nusrat Farfella (voice)
The Palace (2011) – Sergeant Karem Akalin
Taken 2 (2012) – Inspector Durmaz
Yozgat Blues (2013) – Sadettin Usta
Şarkı Söyleyen Kadınlar (2013) – Mesut
The Cut (2014) – Hagob Nakashian
Exodus: Gods and Kings (2014) – Jethro
Niyazi Gül Dörtnala (2015) – Süleyman
The Promise (2016) – Vartan Boghossian

Television
The Portrait of a Lady (1968) - Servant
Virgin of the Secret Service (1968) - Corporal
Doctor Who Episode The Wheel in Space (1968) – Kemel Rudkin
Detective Series 3, Episode 3: Art Attack (1968) – Garcia
The Saint (1968) - Hima Dri
The Avengers (1969) - Rossi
Jason King (1972) - Kemal
In for a Penny (1972) - Ail
Adam Smith (1972) - Homi
New Scotland Yard (1972) - Joe Angeloulos 
The Upper Crust (1973) - Postman
Little Big Time (1973) - Various roles
Bowler (1973) - Marcus 
The Onedin Line (1972) - Hadji Ahmet’s Spokesman
The Sunday Drama (1977) - Barman
BBC2 play of the week (1977) - Nicholas
Who Pays the Ferryman? (1977) - Doctor
Who Pays the Ferryman? Episode 8: The Daughters of Themis (1977) – Doctor
Mind Your Language (1977–1979) – Maximillian Papandrious
The Professionals (1978-1979) - Sniper 
Crown Court (1978-1982) - Seth Lambert
Screenplay (1979) - Stavros 
Minder — Series 1, Episode 6: Aces High...And Sometimes Very Low (1979) - Chris; Series 10 - Chico (The Ultimate Contraption)
The Professionals Series 2, Episode 9: Blind Run and Series 3 Episode 2: Backtrack (1978–1979) – Sniper / Hanish, Mr. X
Auf Wiedersehen Pet Series 1, Episode 11 (1984) – Kemal
Duty Free (1984) - Policeman
The First Olympics: Athens 1896 (1984) - Mr. Persakrs 
Cold Warrior (1984) - Yussif
Scarecrow and Mrs. King (1984) - Ortiz
Boon (1987) - David Sulenkian
House of Cards (1990) - Mr. Naresh
Zorro (1991) - Picotin the Valet 
The Bill (1991-1993) - Kemal 
Agatha Christie's Poirot Series 4, Episode 3: One, Two, Buckle My Shoe (1992) – Amberiotis
Van der Valk (1992) - Colombian 
Press Gang (1992) - Fahid
The Good Guys (1993) - Janosci
The Young Indiana Jones Chronicles (1993) - Armenian Agent
House of Cards: The Final Cut (1995) — Nures 
The Detectives (1995) - Josef Esterhazy 
Birds of a Feather (1997) – Inspector Miltiades
In the Beginning  (2000) - Prison Governor
The American Embassy (2002) - Mullah
Spooks (2002) - Ozan Coscar
Judge John Deed (2002) - Idries Shahatra
Casualty (2003) - Hussen 
Egypt (2005) - Yanni Athenasiou
Silent Witness (2008-2017) - Varkey Khoury 
Babalar ve Evlatlar (2012)
Strike Back (2013) - Al-Zuhari
Reaksyon (2014) - Oktem Cetiner
Payitaht: Abdülhamid (2017–) – Alexander Israil Parvus
Kanaka (2018) - Enki Tamay
Homeland (2020) - Agha Jan
Hay Sultan (2021)
Baptiste (2021) - Series 2 - Mehmet

References

External links

1943 births
Living people
People from Diyarbakır
Male actors from Istanbul
Armenian film actors
Armenian television actors
British film actors
British television actors
Naturalised citizens of the United Kingdom
British people of Armenian descent
Alumni of Rose Bruford College